Novocin Peak is one of the Bean Peaks, located near the southeast end of this group, in the Hauberg Mountains, Palmer Land. First observed from aircraft by the Ronne Antarctic Research Expedition (RARE), 1947–48. Mapped by United States Geological Survey (USGS) from surveys and U.S. Navy air photos, 1961–67. Named by Advisory Committee on Antarctic Names (US-ACAN) for Norbert W. Novocin Sr., meteorologist at Byrd Station, summer 1965–66.

Mountains of Palmer Land